Virtual Sports are electronic games that generate visual feedback on a display device. Inspired by real sports these games originated from fantasy sports that were drawn using paper and pencil. The use of computers has transformed these fantasy sports from being mostly played by a group of friends or acquaintances in a local community to potentially being anonymously played from around the world.

The first time Virtual Sports were used on a computer was in 1961, in an early form of fantasy baseball coded for an IBM 1620 computer by John Burgeson. It allowed two teams to play one another using random number generation and player statistics to determine a game's outcome, including a play-by-play description. The game was coded for a computer with only 20 KB in computer memory and was entirely self-contained.

Modern computers with motion capture technologies can produce more complex sports animations.

The term virtual sports is often used to describe software simulations of sports used for betting purposes. Some betting house and racinos use this kind of software because clients use to bet more than with the normal sports.

References

Games and sports introduced in 1961
Sports video games